The Maxine Goodman Levin College of Urban Affairs (Levin) is an accredited college of urban studies, public administration, urban planning, environmental studies, and nonprofit management at Cleveland State University located in Cleveland, Ohio. The Levin College offers undergraduate, graduate, and doctoral degrees, as well as professional development programs. Its urban policy research centers and programs provide communities with decision-making tools to address their policy challenges. The Levin College is recognized for offering highly ranked programs in urban policy, local government management, nonprofit management, and public management and leadership.

The Levin College is located on the Cleveland State University campus housed on the historic Euclid Avenue in The Playhouse Square District in downtown Cleveland.

In 2016, Roland V. Anglin, previously the senior advisor to the chancellor and director of the Joseph C. Cornwall Center for Metropolitan Studies at Rutgers University-Newark, was named dean.

History 
In 1967, following the Hough riots and student protests on campus, Dr. Thomas F. Campbell and a group of Cleveland State faculty formed the Ad Hoc Committee on Urban Studies and called on the university to form an urban institute to "bring together faculty from a wide range of specializations to work on urban problems in an interdisciplinary setting, designed in particular to facilitate communication between specialists with common interests in urban problems... linking academic specialists with the political and economic leadership of a large metropolis.... [including] a full range of undergraduate courses focusing on urban problems, particularly in the social sciences."

The Institute of Urban Studies first offered classes in the fall of 1968 with the financial support of the Gund Foundation. The program was one of the first members of the Council of University Institutes of Urban Affairs, which became the Urban Affairs Association in 1981.

In 1969, Maxine Goodman Levin, founder of the Cleveland Landmarks Commission and the Cleveland Restoration Society, and a real estate developer, established the Albert A. Levin Chair of Urban Studies and Public Service in honor of her late husband. It was the first endowed chair in the country to allow the chair holder to combine classroom teachings with public service to study and work at finding solutions to urban problems. Cleveland State reorganized the Institute as the College of Urban Affairs consisting of a single department of Urban Studies in 1977. In 1989, the college was renamed the Maxine Goodman Levin College of Urban Affairs, following the benefactor's gift of an endowment to support the college.

Degree programs

Undergraduate Degree Programs 

The Levin College offers Bachelor of Arts degrees in Urban and Regional Studies, Public Safety Management, Environmental Studies, Organizational Leadership,  Nonprofit Administration, and Economic Development.

Graduate Degree Programs 

Levin offers a Master of Public Administration (MPA), Master of Urban Planning and Development (MUPD), Master of Science in Urban Studies (MS), Master of Arts in Environmental Studies (MA), and a Master of Nonprofit Administration and Leadership (MNAL).

Dual degree programs leading to a Juris Doctor are offered in conjunction with the Cleveland–Marshall College of Law.

Levin also offers a Ph.D. in Urban Studies and Public Affairs.

Rankings 
The 2022 U.S. News & World Report ranking of best public affairs graduate schools ranked the Levin College #2 in the Urban Policy specialty, #16 in the Local Government Management specialty., #23 in the Nonprofit Management specialty, and #40 in the Public Management and Leadership specialty.

The Levin College graduate urban planning degree was highly ranked in both the economic development and community development specializations in the Planetizen Guide to Urban Planning Programs - 4th Edition in 2015.

Student organizations 
CSU APA is the Levin College student group affiliated with the Cleveland section of the Ohio chapter of the American Planning Association. A student from CSU APA serves as a member of the executive committee of APA Cleveland. The student-run organization "strives to facilitate the exchange of ideas and thoughtful discussions, foster professional development, and create a sense of community among all students at Cleveland State University."

CSU ICMA is the student chapter of the International City/County Management Association, and is also affiliated with the Ohio City/County Management Association (OCMA), "the leading organization in the State of Ohio promoting and developing excellence in local government."  The group partners with CSU APA to coordinate a speaker series, organize professional development events, host forums, and offer a shadowing program.

Phi Alpha Alpha, "the Global Honor Society for Public Affairs and Administration" has a chapter at Levin College.

The CSU Student Environmental Movement is a group, "dedicated to making a green difference here on campus and the surrounding Cleveland area."

Research Centers 
The Levin College houses research centers and programs that provide urban leaders with decision support tools, technical assistance, and data analysis services.
The five core research centers at the Levin College are:
 Center for Community Planning and Development
 Center for Economic Development
 Center for Population Dynamics
 Center for Public and Nonprofit Management
 Energy Policy Center

The Levin College is also home to the additional research centers and programs including but not limited to:
 Center for Emergency Preparedness
 Community Planning Program
 Levin College Forum 
 Northern Ohio Data and Information Service (NODIS)
CSU's Office of Civic Engagement
 Ohio Center for the Advancement of Women in Public Service
 Unger Program
 Water Resilient Cities Program

Professional Development 
The Levin College offers courses, workshops, and seminars for individuals and organizations seeking to improve their skills as urban leaders. The college also serves as the official Certified Public Manager® (CPM) program for the State of Ohio and offers comprehensive and nationally certified development programs for state and local government leaders and public administrators.

 ArcGIS Workshop
Certified Public Manager® Program
 Leadership Academy
 LeanOhio Boot Camp
 Public Management Academy

Notable alumni 

 Nickie J. Antonio (MPA 1992) Ohio State Representative.
 Nan Baker (Leadership Academy 2001) former Ohio State Representative.
 Janis Bowdler (MS Urban Policy) President, JP Morgan Chase Foundation.
 Madeline Cain (MPA 1985) First female mayor of Lakewood, Ohio. Former Ohio State Representative.
 Jane Campbell (MS Urban Studies 1980) First female mayor of Cleveland, Ohio.
 Jerry Frangas (MPA 1995) former member of the Colorado House of Representatives.
 Tim Hagan (BA Urban Studies 1975) Former Cuyahoga County Commissioner and Democratic nominee for Governor of Ohio
 Stephanie Howse, (MA Environmental Studies) State Representative, House District 11 of Ohio House of Representative
 Frank G. Jackson (BA Urban Studies 1975, MA Urban Affairs 1977) Mayor of Cleveland, Ohio.
 John McNally IV (MPA/JD 1996) Former mayor of Youngstown, Ohio.
 Kent Smith (MS Urban Studies 2001) Ohio State Representative.
 Matt Zone (BA Urban Studies 1999) City councilman in Cleveland, Ohio and president of the National League of Cities.

References

See also 
 Levin College

Cleveland State University
Urban studies and planning schools
1967 establishments in Ohio
Public administration schools
Environmental studies institutions in the United States
Educational institutions established in 1967
Universities and colleges in Cleveland
Education in Ohio